Rheinheimera salexigens is a Gram-negative and rod-shaped bacterium from the genus of Rheinheimera which has been isolated from a fishing hook from Oahu.

References 

Chromatiales
Bacteria described in 2018